Aabbassiyeh     is a town in the  Tyre District in  South Lebanon.

Name
According to E. H. Palmer in 1881, the name Aabbassiyeh came from the proper name ‘Abbâs, the uncle of the prophet.

Location
Aabbassiyeh is located in the South Governorate, Tyre District. It is 150 m above sea level and 84 kilometers to the southwest of Beirut, the capital city of Lebanon, and 14 km from the center of its district Tyre.

History
In 1875, Victor Guérin estimated the population to be 600 Metawileh.

In 1881, the PEF's Survey of Western Palestine (SWP) described it as: "A stone-built village, containing 400 Metawileh, built on a ridge ; the ground around it is cultivated for barley, etc., and there are groves of figs and olives. The water supply is derived from a large pool to the north, and a good spring built up with masonry, also to the north of the village ; there are no antiquities, and only a few cisterns."

Notable people 

 Houssein Rizk (born 1997), Lebanese footballer

References

Bibliography

External links
  Aabbassiyeh, Localiban
Survey of Western Palestine, Map 1:  IAA, Wikimedia commons 

Populated places in Tyre District
Shia Muslim communities in Lebanon